The Berlin Crisis of 1958–1959 was a crisis over the status of West Berlin during the Cold War. It resulted from efforts by Soviet leader Nikita Khrushchev to react strongly against American nuclear warheads located in West Germany, and build up the prestige of the Soviet satellite state of East Germany. American President Dwight D. Eisenhower mobilized NATO opposition. He was strongly supported by German Chancellor Konrad Adenauer, but Great Britain went along reluctantly. There was never any military action. The result was a continuation of the status quo in Berlin, and a move by Eisenhower and Khrushchev toward détente. The Berlin problem had not disappeared, and escalated into a major conflict over building the Berlin Wall in 1961. See Berlin Crisis of 1961.

Background

Emigration through East Berlin

Between 1945 and 1950, over 1.5 million people emigrated from Soviet-occupied Eastern European countries to the West. Entry into West Germany from the East was relatively easy. The number of Eastern Europeans (mostly Germans) applying for political asylum in West Germany was 197,000 in 1950, 165,000 in 1951, 182,000 in 1952 and 331,000 in 1953. The exodus was especially high among intellectuals, engineers and highly skilled workers. The drain became intolerable for the Kremlin, which in the early 1950s imposed the system of emigration restriction on their satellites. In 1953 the Inner German border between the two German states was closed. In 1955, the Kremlin transferred control over civilian access in Berlin to East Germany, officially abdicating direct responsibility of matters therein, thus passing control to a government not recognized by the Western powers that held sovereignty in West Berlin, the United States, Britain, and France. There were still far too many visitors who never returned, so the East German government stopped all travel between the west and east in 1956.

Despite the official closing of the Inner German border in 1952, the border in Berlin remained considerably more accessible than the rest of the border because it was administered by all four occupying powers. Accordingly, Berlin became the main route by which East Germans left for the West. The Berlin sector border was essentially a "loophole" through which Eastern Bloc citizens could still escape. The millions of East Germans who had escaped by 1961 totalled a fifth of the entire East German population.  The loss was disproportionately heavy among professionals—engineers, technicians, physicians, teachers, lawyers and skilled workers. The "brain drain" of professionals had become so damaging to the political credibility and economic viability of East Germany that closing this loophole and securing the Soviet-imposed east–west-Berlin frontier was imperative.

1958 Berlin ultimatum 
Soviet Premier Nikita Khrushchev in early 1958 finally achieved full power as Communist Party leader and Premier in the Kremlin. Bolstered by the worldwide success of the Sputnik project, he was overconfident of Soviet military superiority. He was annoyed that the U.S. was locating nuclear missiles at American bases in West Germany and wanted bargaining leverage to reverse that threat. Although critics worried about his tendency to recklessness, he decided to announce decisive actions that would finally resolve the German situation.

Khrushchev sought to find a lasting solution to the problem of a divided Germany and of the enclave of West Berlin deep within East German territory. In November 1958, calling West Berlin a "malignant tumor", he gave the United States, United Kingdom and France six months to conclude a peace treaty with both German states and the Soviet Union. If one was not signed, Khrushchev stated, the Soviet Union would conclude a peace treaty with East Germany. This would leave East Germany, which was not a party to treaties giving the Western Powers access to Berlin, in control of the routes to the city. This ultimatum caused dissent among the Western Allies, who were reluctant to go to war over the issue. Khrushchev, however, repeatedly extended the deadline.

In November 1958, Khrushchev issued the Western powers an ultimatum to withdraw from Berlin within six months and make it a free, demilitarised city. Khrushchev declared that, at the end of that period, the Soviet Union would turn over control of all lines of communication with West Berlin to East Germany, meaning the western powers would have access to West Berlin only when East Germany permitted it. In response, the United States, United Kingdom, and France clearly expressed their strong determination to remain in, and maintain their legal right of free access to, West Berlin.

With tensions mounting, the United States, United Kingdom and France formed a covert group with orders to plan for an eventual response to any aggression on West Berlin. The planning group was named LIVE OAK, and staff from the three countries prepared land and air plans to guarantee access to and from West Berlin.

From the NATO perspective West Berlin—deep in Communist territory—had no military value. However it was the preeminent symbol of resistance to Soviet takeover of Europe. Eisenhower commented that Berlin was an "instance in which our political posture requires us to assume military postures that are wholly illogical.” British Prime Minister Harold Macmillan visited Moscow for extended discussions with Khrushchev in February 1959. The meetings were mostly cordial; the ultimatum was dropped.

Negotiations
The Soviet Union withdrew its deadline in May 1959, and the foreign ministers of the four countries spent three months meeting. They did not come to any major agreements, but this process led to negotiations and to Khrushchev's September 1959 visit to the United States, at the end of which he and Eisenhower jointly asserted that general disarmament was of utmost importance and that such issues as that of Berlin "should be settled, not by the application of force, but by peaceful means through negotiations."

Eisenhower and Khrushchev met at the US presidential retreat Camp David, where they talked frankly with each other. "There was nothing more inadvisable in this situation," said Eisenhower, "than to talk about ultimatums, since both sides knew very well what would happen if an ultimatum were to be implemented." Khrushchev responded that he did not understand how a peace treaty could be regarded by the American people as a "threat to peace". Eisenhower admitted that the situation in Berlin was "abnormal" and that "human affairs got very badly tangled at times." Khrushchev came away with the impression that a deal was possible over Berlin, and they agreed to continue the dialogue at a summit in Paris in May 1960. However, the Paris Summit that was to resolve the Berlin question was cancelled in the fallout from Gary Powers's failed U-2 spy flight on 1 May 1960.

See also
 Escape attempts and victims of the inner German border
 Flight and expulsion of Germans (1944–1950)
Republikflucht Flight from East Germany
 History of Berlin
 Nikita Khrushchev
 Presidency of Dwight D. Eisenhower
 Rapacki Plan, Polish proposal for nuclear free zone in central Europe; never adopted

Notes

Further reading

Bark, Dennis L. and David R. Gress. A history of West Germany: volume 1: from shadow to substance 1945-1963 (1989) pp. 435–461. online
 Barker, Elisabeth. “The Berlin Crisis 1958-1962.” International Affairs 39#1 (1963), pp. 59–73. online.

 Beschloss, Michael. The Crisis Years: Kennedy and Khrushchev, 1960–1963 (1991) online
 Bialer, Seweryn and Michael Mandelbaum,eds. Gorbachev's Russia and American foreign policy (1988) online
  Bowie, Robert R. and Richard H. Immerman. Waging peace: how Eisenhower shaped an enduring cold war strategy (1998) online

 Brandt, Willi. " The Berlin Crisis" Pakistan Horizon 12#1 (1959), pp. 25–29. online, by the Mayor of West Berlin.
 Burr, William. "Avoiding the Slippery Slope: The Eisenhower Administration and the Berlin Crisis, November 1958-January 1959" Diplomatic History (1994) 18#2 pp  177–205 online

 Clay, Lucius D. The papers of General Lucius D. Clay: Germany, 1945-1949 (1974) online, a primary source
 Damms, Richard V. The Eisenhower presidency 1953-1961 (2002) pp. 88–97. online
 Dowty, Alan. Closed Borders: The Contemporary Assault on Freedom of Movement (Yale Up, 1989), 
 Eisenhower, Dwight D. Waging Peace, 1956-1961: The White House Years. Vol. 2 (1965) pp 329–60, 397–465. online, a primary source.
 Geelhoed, E. Bruce. Diplomacy Shot Down: The U-2 Crisis and Eisenhower’s Aborted Mission to Moscow, 1959–1960 (University of Oklahoma Press, 2020).
 Harrison, Hope M. "Berlin and the Cold War Struggle over Germany." in The Routledge Handbook of the Cold War (Routledge, 2014) pp. 56-73.

 Harrison, Hope M. Driving the Soviets up the Wall: Soviet–East German Relations, 1953–1961 (Princeton UP, 2005) pp 96–138. excerpt
 Hitchcock, William I. The age of Eisenhower America and the world in the 1950s (2018) pp. 407–431. excerpt
 Loescher, Gil. The UNHCR and World Politics: A Perilous Path (Oxford UP, 2001). 
 Lunak, Petr. "Khrushchev and the Berlin Crisis: Soviet brinkmanship seen from inside." Cold War History 3.2 (2003): 53–82.
 McAdams, James. Germany Divided: From Wall to Reunification (1993).

 Newman, Kitty. Macmillan, Khrushchev and the Berlin Crisis, 1958-1960 (Routledge, 2007).
 Pach, Jester J and Elmo Richardson. The presidency of Dwight D Eisenhower (2nd ed., 1991 pp, 200207.
 Pearson, Raymond. The Rise and Fall of the Soviet Empire (1998), 
 Schick, Jack M. The Berlin crisis, 1958-1962 (1971) online
 Stefancic, David. "The Rapacki Plan: A Case Study of European Diplomacy." East European Quarterly 21.4 (1987): 401.
 Taubman, William. Khrushchev: the man and his era (2003) online
 
 Trachtenberg, Marc. A constructed peace: the making of the European settlement, 1945-1963 (Princeton UP, 1999) pp. 251–282.
 Windsor, Philip. "The Berlin Crises" History Today'' (June 1962) Vol. 6, p375-384, summarizes the series of crises 1946 to 1961; online.

External links
The Wall, 1958–1963 
Forty Years Crisis
  West German Ministry of Refugees and Displaced Persons. "Post-war German population movements" (1966)

Cold War history of Germany
Crisis of 1958-59
Inner German border
Battles and conflicts without fatalities
Foreign relations of the Soviet Union
Germany–Soviet Union relations
Soviet Union–United States relations
1958 in international relations
1958 in East Germany
1958 in West Germany
1959 in international relations
1959 in East Germany
1959 in West Germany
Crisis of 1958-59
Cold War history of the Soviet Union
Diplomatic incidents
Crisis of 1958-59